Taivas lyö tulta is the first single by the Finnish power metal band Teräsbetoni, and was released in February 2005. It is perhaps the most well known song by the band, and it rose to the top of the Finnish single list during its release week, followed by much radio play and the band becoming more widely known.

Track listings

References

2005 singles
2005 songs
Warner Music Group singles